Plateau State Polytechnic is a state owned polytechnic in Plateau State, North Central Nigeria. The institution has two campuses, one at Barkin Ladi  and the other at Bukuru near Jos, the capital of the state. It provides education to degree and national diploma level. The rector is BLDR. John Dawam.

History
The institution was founded in 1978 as a College of Technology on the site of Government Technical College, Bukuru. It became a polytechnic in 1980.

Courses offered 

 Agricultural Engineering / Technology
 Banking and Finance
 Building Technology
 Business Administration and Management
 Civil Engineering Technology
 Computer Engineering
 Computer Science
 Electrical Electronics Engineering
 Foundry Technology
 Hospitality Management
 Leisure and Tourism
 Library and Information Science
 Local Government Studies
 Mechanical Engineering Technology
 Metallurgy
 Mineral Resources and Engineering Technology
 Office Technology and Management
 Public Administration
 Quantity Surveying
 Science Laboratory Technology
 Social Development
 Statistics
 Urban and Regional Planning

References

External links
Official website

Universities and colleges in Nigeria
Vocational education in Nigeria
Plateau State
Educational institutions established in 1978
1978 establishments in Nigeria